The 2021–22 Vancouver Canucks season was the 52nd season for the National Hockey League franchise that was established on May 22, 1970. The Canucks missed the playoffs for the second straight season, as they were eliminated from playoff contention  when the Dallas Stars defeated the Vegas Golden Knights 3–2 in a shootout on April 26, 2022.

On December 5, after a home loss to the Pittsburgh Penguins, the Canucks fired both head coach Travis Green, and general manager Jim Benning following a slow start that led to the hiring of Bruce Boudreau as their next head coach. Team President Jim Rutherford was hired four days later on December 9. And Patrik Allvin was hired a month later on January 26, 2022. All during the entire season.

Standings

Divisional standings

Conference standings

Schedule and results

Preseason
The Canucks released their pre-season schedule on July 20, 2021.

Regular season
The regular season schedule was released on July 22, 2021, with only a handful of games originally scheduled in February because NHL players were planning to participate in the 2022 Winter Olympics. As the result of an outbreak of COVID-19 that affected multiple teams and reduced attendance capacity in Canadian NHL cities, the league pulled out of the Olympics after postponing nearly 100 games in order to finish the regular season by April 29. Most the postponed games were made up during the initially scheduled Olympic break in February.

Player statistics

Skaters

Goaltenders

†Denotes player spent time with another team before joining the Canucks. Stats reflect time with the Canucks only.
‡Denotes player was traded mid-season. Stats reflect time with the Canucks only.
Bold/italics denotes franchise record.

Awards and honours

Awards

Milestones

Records

Transactions
The Canucks have been involved in the following transactions during the 2021–22 season.

Trades

Players acquired

Players lost

Signings

Draft picks

Below are the Vancouver Canucks' selections at the 2021 NHL Entry Draft, which will be held virtually via video conference call on July 23 and 24, 2021 from the NHL Network studios in Secaucus, New Jersey, due to the COVID-19 pandemic.

References

Vancouver Canucks seasons
Vancouver Canucks
Canucks